James V. McConnell (October 26, 1925 – April 9, 1990) was an American biologist and animal psychologist. He is most known for his research on learning and memory transfer in planarians conducted in the 1950s and 1960s. McConnell also published several science fiction short stories in the mid-1950s.

Career
Most of McConnell's academic career was spent in the psychology department at the University of Michigan, where he was a professor from 1963 through his retirement in 1988. He was an unconventional scientist, setting up his own refereed journal, the Journal of Biological Psychology, which was published in tandem with the Worm Runner's Digest, a planarian-themed humor magazine. His paper Memory transfer through cannibalism in planarians, published in the Journal of Neuropsychiatry, reported that when planarians conditioned to respond to a stimulus were ground up and fed to other planarians, the recipients learned to respond to the stimulus faster than a control group did. McConnell believed that this was evidence of a chemical basis for memory, which he identified as memory RNA. Although well publicized, his findings were not completely reproducible by other scientists and were therefore at the time completely discredited (for review, see Chapouthier, 1973).

McConnell's work has been referred to by a scientist who hypothesized that McConnell's results could be explained by RNA interference (Smallheiser, 2001).

McConnell originally published satirical articles alongside serious scientific articles in the Journal of Biological Psychology but received complaints that it was difficult if not impossible to tell which was which. He decided to publish the satirical Worm Runner's Digest upside down with its cover as the back of the Journal of Biological Psychology to make it clear which articles were satire. This, he said, created problems with librarians returning the Journal to the publisher with the complaint that it was improperly bound. He was amused by this. He spent many of his evening hours in the 1960s in informal rap sessions with students in their dorms. He was prone to making provocative statements, believed that memory was chemically based and that in the future humanity would be programmed by drugs. He once commented that he would rather be "a programmer than a programmee".

McConnell was one of the targets of Theodore Kaczynski, the Unabomber. In 1985, he suffered a hearing loss when a bomb, disguised as a manuscript, was opened at his house by his research assistant Nicklaus Suino.

Short fiction
 "Life Sentence" (Galaxy Science Fiction, January 1953)  
 "All of You" (Beyond Fantasy Fiction, July 1953)  
 "The Game of White" (Other Worlds Science Stories, July 1953)
 "Grandma Perkins and the Space Pirates" (Planet Stories, March 1954)
 "Phone Me in Central Park" (Planet Stories, Fall 1954)
 "Hunting License" (Imagination, April 1955) 
 "Avoidance Situation" (If, February 1956)  about subspace
 "Nor Dust Corrupt" (If, February 1957)
 "Learning Theory" (If, December 1957)

References
 R. Thompson and J. V. McConnell (1955) "Classical conditioning in planarian, Dugesia dorotocephala", J. Comp. Physiol. Psych. 48, 65–68.
 J. V. McConnell, (1962) "Memory transfer through cannibalism in planarium", J. Neuropsychiat. 3 suppl 1 542–48
 Block, R.A, and McConnell, J. V., "Classically conditioned discrimination in the Planarian, Dugesia dorotocephala", Nature, 215, Sept. 30, 1465–66, (1967).
 Georges Chapouthier, "Behavioral studies of the molecular basis of memory", in: The Physiological Basis of Memory (J.A. Deutsch, ed.), 1973, Academic Press, New York and London, Chap. l, l–25
 N. R. Smalheiser, H. Manev & E. Costa (2001) "RNAi and brain function: was McConnell on the right track?" Trends in Neurosciences, 24, 216–18.

External links
 Bio
 Unabomber attack
 
 Everything2 Node
 
 
 

1925 births
1990 deaths
American neuroscientists
Unabomber targets
University of Michigan faculty
American science fiction writers